Charlie Fetoai (born 11 January 1987) is a rugby union player for the Queensland Reds in the Super Rugby competition.

Charlie Fetoai's position of choice is as a centre.

Background
Fetoai was born in Auckland, New Zealand.

Career
He was contracted to the Brisbane Broncos in the NRL but he opted to turn his hand at Rugby Union with the Queensland Reds and play in the Super Rugby competition.

References

External links
Queensland Reds profile
2006 Scorers
NSW AND QLD UNDER 19'S TEAMS
QUEENSLAND WIZARD CUP PREVIEW - ROUND 16
SARugby profile

1987 births
Living people
Australian rugby league players
Australian rugby union players
Australian people of New Zealand descent
Australian sportspeople of Samoan descent
Brisbane Broncos players
People educated at Brisbane State High School
Rugby league centres
Rugby league players from Auckland
Rugby union centres
Rugby union players from Auckland
Toowoomba Clydesdales players